Steven W. Joslyn in an American college baseball coach.

After completing a degree in physical education at North Central College, Joslyn began coaching as an assistant baseball coach at Aurora in 1986 before becoming a basketball, football, and baseball assistant coach at a series of Illinois high schools.  in 1996, he returned to the college ranks as an assistant baseball coach at his alma mater, North Central.  He moved to Northern Illinois in 2003 to work for Ed Mathey.  After a promotion to Associate Head Coach in 2008, Joslyn accepted the head coaching position at Chicago State University. He held that position until the conclusion of the 2020 season when the school's baseball program was discontinued.

Head coaching record
The following table shows Joslyn's record as a college head coach.

References

External links
Chicago State Cougars bio

Year of birth missing (living people)
Living people
Aurora Spartans baseball coaches
Chicago State Cougars baseball coaches
High school baseball coaches in the United States
High school basketball coaches in Illinois
High school football coaches in Illinois
North Central College alumni
North Central Cardinals baseball coaches
Northern Illinois Huskies baseball coaches